Michael Sim (born 23 October 1984) is an Australian professional golfer.

Amateur career
Sim was born in Aberdeen, Scotland, and moved to Australia when he was 5 years old. He was an Australian Institute of Sport scholarship holder in 2002. He was the top ranked amateur in the world in 2005 having won four titles during the year including the Sunnehanna Amateur and the Monroe Invitational. He turned professional at the end of the year.

Professional career
Sim played on the Nationwide Tour in 2006, and qualified for the PGA Tour by virtue of a 19th-place finish on the end of season money list, aided by a win at PalmettoPride Classic. After a late start to the 2007 season, caused by a stress fracture of the spine, he finished 169th on the PGA Tour money list. He was granted a medical extension for 2008, but failed to win enough money in five events to retain his place on the PGA Tour, and he returned to the second tier Nationwide Tour. In April 2009, Sim's bid to return to the elite tour got off to a good start when he secured his second career victory at the Stonebrae Classic, finishing six strokes clear of the field. The following week he finished in second after losing in a playoff to Patrick Sheehan, and then in May he won the BMW Charity Pro-Am in a playoff over Fabián Gómez.

Sim played with Tiger Woods during the final round of the 2009 U. S. Open and finished in at tie for 18th. He was invited a month later by the PGA to play in the 2009 PGA Championship at Hazeltine National Golf Club where he finished T51.

Sim won the Christmas in October Classic to earn an automatic "battlefield promotion" to the PGA Tour. The victory was his third Nationwide Tour win of 2009 and his fourth overall. With the win he also set the Nationwide Tour single season money title, earning well over half a million dollars. He was one of the top 50 players in the Official World Golf Rankings in 2009, which earned him entry into the 2010 Masters Tournament; he later withdrew from the tournament due to injury. He also won the PGA Tour of Australasia Order of Merit in 2009.

Sim performed moderately on the PGA Tour in 2010, with the highlight of his season being a T2 at the Farmers Insurance Open. He comfortably retained his card by finishing 65th on the money list. In 2011 Sim could not follow up his PGA Tour rookie season and went back to the Web.com Tour  in 2012. A string of injuries limited Sim after the 2011 season and he played sparingly on the PGA Tour of Australasia, Korean Tour, OneAsia Tour, and Web.com Tour.

Amateur wins
2002 Western Australia Amateur Championship, Victorian Junior Masters
2004 Riversdale Cup, Southern Amateur
2005 New Zealand Amateur Stroke-Play Championship, Western Australia Amateur Matchplay Championship, Sunnehanna Amateur, Monroe Invitational

Professional wins (7)

PGA Tour of Australasia wins (2)

PGA Tour of Australasia playoff record (1–1)

Nationwide Tour wins (4)

Nationwide Tour playoff record (2–2)

Other wins (1)

Other playoff record (0–1)

Results in major championships

Note: Sim never played in the Masters Tournament.

CUT = missed the half-way cut
"T" = tied

Results in The Players Championship

CUT = missed the halfway cut

Results in World Golf Championships

QF, R16, R32, R64 = Round in which player lost in match play
"T" = Tied

Team appearances
Amateur
Nomura Cup (representing Australia): 2003 (winners), 2005 (winners)
Eisenhower Trophy (representing Australia): 2004

See also
2006 Nationwide Tour graduates
2009 Nationwide Tour graduates
List of golfers with most Web.com Tour wins

References

External links

Australian male golfers
PGA Tour of Australasia golfers
PGA Tour golfers
Korn Ferry Tour graduates
Australian Institute of Sport golfers
Scottish emigrants to Australia
Sportspeople from Aberdeen
Golfers from Perth, Western Australia
1984 births
Living people